Scopula tenuimargo is a moth of the family Geometridae. It is found in the Democratic Republic of Congo.

References

Moths described in 1916
tenuimargo
Insects of the Democratic Republic of the Congo
Moths of Africa
Endemic fauna of the Democratic Republic of the Congo